Işıklar is a village in the central district of Hakkâri Province in Turkey. The village is populated by Kurds of the Pinyanişî tribe and had a population of 340 in 2022.

The three hamlets of Çamışlar, Çavuşlu, Gelincik, Soğucak and Küçükköşk are attached to Işıklar.

Population 
Population history from 2000 to 2022:

References 

Villages in Hakkâri District
Kurdish settlements in Hakkâri Province